Infamous is the second studio album by Canadian electronicore band Abandon All Ships. It was released on July 3, 2012, through Rise Records. On January 18, 2012, the band announced that they were in the process or recording their second studio album, which they initially intended for a late-spring or early-summer release. The album's lead single, "Infamous," features guest rap vocals by Canadian rapper A-Game. A music video for the song was released on May 1, which the band described as "very Toronto." On June 12, "Good Old Friend" was available for streaming. Infamous debuted at number 142 on the Billboard 200, selling more than 3,500 copies within its first week of release, while also reaching number 54 on the Canadian Albums Chart.

Track listing

Personnel
Abandon All Ships
 Angelo Aita – lead vocals and composer
 Martin Broda – clean vocals, bass guitar and composer
 Daniel Ciccotelli – lead guitar
 Chris Taylor – drums, percussion and composer
 Sebastian Cassisi-Nunez – synthesizers, keyboards, programming and composer

Production
 Anthony Calabretta - production, engineering
 João Carvalho - engineering, mastering
 Thomas Gutches - management
 Steve Haining - photography
 Dan Hand - management
 Colin Lewis - booking
 Simon Paul - artwork
 Dave Shapiro - booking
 Mark Spicoluk - production, management
 Marco Walzel - booking

Charts

References 

2012 albums
Abandon All Ships albums